Alexander Dmitryevich Beglov (born 19 May 1956) is a Russian politician. He was appointed acting Governor of Saint Petersburg on 3 October 2018. In the 2019 Saint Petersburg gubernatorial election, Beglov won with 64.43% of the votes.

Early life
Beglov was born in Baku on 19 May 1956. In 1983, he graduated from Saint-Petersburg State University of Architecture and Civil Engineering with a degree in Industrial and Civil Engineering, and in 2003, the North-West Academy of Public Administration.

His wife chairs the Civil Registration Department within the St. Petersburg City Administration. His daughter is head of the Legal Culture Committee of St. Petersburg.

Career
From 1976 to 1978, he served in the USSR Armed Forces.

From 1979 to 1985, he worked in engineering and management positions in construction organizations in Leningrad.

From 1985 to 1988 – Head of the Department of Construction and Building Materials Industry of the Lensovet Executive Committee.

From 1989 to 1990 – Head of the Social and Economic Department of the Leningrad Regional Committee CPSU. According to media reports, Beglov oversaw the housing development of the Kupchino, Rybatskoye, Lake Dolgoe microdistricts, the construction of the Aluminum Structures Plant, the Belayia Mel city urban wastewater treatment plant, the Olginsky wastewater treatment plant and the water pumping station in Rybatsky. In addition, Beglov supervised the construction of structures in different regions of Russia in the aftermath of the 1988 earthquake in Armenia.

From 1990 to 1991, he was deputy head of the capital construction department of the executive committee of the Leningrad Council.

From 1991 to 1997, he served as chief engineer and co-owner of the German-Russian joint venture Melazel. The company had partnerships with the Committee on Foreign Economic Relations of St. Petersburg, which was headed by Vladimir Putin (at the same time, "Melazel" was re-registered as "Olympia-2000"). According to media reports, Beglov acted as co-founder of the Aero Record, Ecotech and Baltikstroy enterprises, the Styk production and transport company, and the Business Partner publishing house.

In 1994 he defended his thesis on the topic "Stability of reinforced concrete elements from the plane of bending", candidate of technical sciences.

From 1997 to 1999 he was a Senior Researcher at the Department of Theoretical Mechanics, doctoral student Saint-Petersburg State University of Architecture and Civil Engineering.

From 1999 to 2002, he was the head of the administration of the Kurortny Administrative District of St. Petersburg. He initiated the reconstruction of Freedom Square in Sestroretsk, monuments to Peter the Great and to the designer of the standard-issue 30 caliber rifle, Sergei Ivanovich Mosin, as well as the fountain "Girl with a fish".

From 2002 to 2003 he was Vice-Governor of St. Petersburg and Head of the Office of the Administration of St. Petersburg. According to observers, this appointment was a compromise by the governor of the city Vladimir Yakovlev and the plenipotentiary representative of the Russian president in the North-West Federal District (NWFD), Viktor Cherkesov. It was alleged that Sergei Sviridov, deputy plenipotentiary representative for cadres, advanced Beglov's nomination. The media noted that the legislative assembly approved the new vice-governor only the second time.

In 2003, he graduated from North-West Academy of Public Administration.

On 21 May 2003 he became a member of the United Russia party. On 9 June 2003 he became secretary of the political council of the St. Petersburg regional branch of the United Russia party (replacing Yuri Solonin); The initiator of his election to this post was the head of the Central Executive Committee of the ER Yury Volkov. On 28 April 2004 he was re-elected secretary of the regional political council.

In June 2003, Vladimir Yakovlev prematurely resigned as governor. Beglov served as acting governor for three months before the elections. In the fall of 2003, he was nominated by the United Russia party  as a candidate for deputy of the State Duma of the fourth convocation on the party's federal list  (No. 1 in the regional group "Petersburg"). On 7 December 2003, he was elected to the State Duma and refused the mandate.

From 2003 to 2004 he served as First Deputy Plenipotentiary Representative in the Northwestern Federal District.

In May 2004, he became a presidential aide and head of the Presidential control department. In November 2004, at the V Congress of United Russia, he was elected to the party's supreme council. In October 2005, Beglov became a member of the presidential council for the implementation of priority national projects and demographic policy, and in July 2006 he became a member of the presidium of the council. In December 2005, speaking at a meeting with the heads of the subjects of the Russian Federation within the Ural Federal District, Beglov said that the governors would be personally responsible for the implementation of priority projects.

On 24 July 2004, he departed the post of secretary of the political council of the St. Petersburg regional branch of United Russia, remaining a member of the political council (the new secretary of the political council – ).

From 12 May 2008 – 23 May 2012 he served as Deputy Head of the Presidential Administration of Russia. The post of the head of the administration was taken by former Deputy Prime Minister and Head of the Government, Sergey Naryshkin.

At the end of July 2008, Beglov replaced Viktor Ivanov as chairman of the board of directors of Almaz-Antei.

On 12 January 2009 he chaired the Council under the President of the Russian Federation on the Affairs of the Cossacks.

In September 2010 the case against Yuri Luzhkov was dismissed. Beglova was named among the main contenders for the mayor of Moscow.

In June 2011, Beglov was considered as the main candidate for governor of St. Petersburg, after Valentina Matvienko left for work in Federation Council.

In 2012, Beglov presented his doctoral dissertation on "Management of the production of agricultural products in Cossack communities as a potential for sustainable socio-economic development of regions".

On 23 May 2012, Putin appointed Beglov Presidential Plenipotentiary to Russia in Central Federal District. On 25 December 2017, a Decree of the President of Russia, appointing Beglov as Plenipotentiary Representative of the President Russia in North-West Federal District.

On 3 October 2018, Beglov was appointed as a Governor of Saint Petersburg. In September 2019 he won the gubernatorial election (with a result of over 60% votes leaving the other candidates far behind) and assumed the office on 18 September 2019.

He clashed with Wagner Group head Yevgeniy Prigozhin in November 2022, when his officials refused a permit for an office in Saint Petersburg. Prigozhin Prigozhin accused Beglov of "financially supporting Ukrainian nationalists” and "betraying Russia" and demanded his resignation as governor.

Footnotes

Politicians from Baku
1956 births
Russian politicians
1st class Active State Councillors of the Russian Federation
Living people
Saint-Petersburg State University of Architecture and Civil Engineering alumni
Recipients of the Order "For Merit to the Fatherland", 4th class
Engineers from Baku
Governors of Saint Petersburg
Russian individuals subject to the U.S. Department of the Treasury sanctions